The Atkinson House in Rutherford, California, at 8440 St. Helena Hwy., was built in 1881.  It was listed on the National Register of Historic Places in 1990.

It is Queen Anne in style.  Its "exterior is distinguished by a cut stone foundation, wrap-around porch, fishscale shingles on the gable end, and polygonal tower."

It was deemed significant "for its association with the 'Golden Age of Wine' in the Napa Valley during the 1880s. The building was the main house for the award-winning Ewer and Atkinson Winery in Rutherford which was established in 1881 and whose successes and failures closely paralleled those of the burgeoning wine industry in Napa County during the 1880s. The house is also significant in the architectural history of the area. It is a good representative example of rural residential Queen Anne design in the Napa area.

References

External links

National Register of Historic Places in Napa County, California
Queen Anne architecture in California
Houses completed in 1881